The attorney general of Alabama is an elected, constitutional officer of the State of Alabama. The office of the attorney general is located at the state capitol in Montgomery, Alabama. Henry Hitchcock was elected Alabama's first attorney general in 1819.

Duties
As is common in many states, the attorney general is the chief lawyer of the state. He is called upon as the chief defender of the laws of Alabama, the lawyer for state officials and represents the state in all matters brought before a court of law or tribunal. The attorney general (AG) also provides advisory opinions to local and state governments when questions arise about the constitutionality of proposed laws and regulations. It is the task of the attorney general to represent the state when questions arise concerning various criminal sentences including the death penalty.

From time to time, the attorney general may begin legal proceedings on behalf of the state or on behalf of consumers damaged by illegal or bad faith commercial transactions.

Organization

Eight divisions comprise the attorney general's office. Those divisions include: a General Crimes Division, a Public Corruption Division, Civil Division, Appellate Division, Consumer Protection Division, Constitutional Defense Division and a Medicaid Fraud Control Unit. Division chiefs include Clay J. Crenshaw, Olivia Martin, Billington Garret, M. Matt Hart, Bruce M. Lieberman, and Azzie Taylor.

List of attorneys general of Alabama
The chief deputy attorney general is Alice Martin Andrew Brasher is the solicitor general.

References

External links
 Alabama Attorney General official website
 Alabama Attorneys General list of past officeholders at Alabama Department of Archives and History
 Alabama Attorney General articles at ABA Journal
 News and Commentary at FindLaw
 Code of Alabama at Law.Justia.com
 U.S. Supreme Court Opinions - "Cases with title containing: State of Alabama" at FindLaw
 Alabama State Bar
 Alabama Attorney General profile at National Association of Attorneys General
 Press releases at Alabama Attorney General's office

 
1819 establishments in Alabama